Ataur Rahman (1925–1999) was a Bangladeshi poet. He was awarded Bangla Academy Literary Award in 1970.

Education and career
Rahman earned his master's from the University of Dhaka. He served as a professor of Bengali literature at Bogra A. H. Govt. College from 1960 to 1989.

Works
 Dui Ritu (1956)
 Ekdin Pratidin (1963)
 Nisad Nagare Achhi (1977)
 Bhalobasa Chirashatru (1981)
 Idaning Rabgamavcha (1992)
 Sarata Jiban Dhare (1994)
 Bhalobasa O Tarpar
 Kavi Nazrul (1968)
 Nazrul Kavya Samiksa (1972)
 Nazrul Jibane Prem O Bibaha (1997)

Awards
 Bangla Academy Literary Award (1970)
 Sher-e-Bangla National Award
 Nazrul Memorial Prize (1985)
 Hilali Memorial Prize (1987)

References

1925 births
1999 deaths
Bangladeshi male poets
University of Dhaka alumni
Recipients of Bangla Academy Award
Date of birth missing
Date of death missing
Place of death missing
20th-century Bengalis
People from Bogra District